Kaynaşlı District is a district of the Düzce Province of Turkey. Its seat is the town of Kaynaşlı. Its area is 237 km2, and its population is 20,449 (2022).

Composition
There is one municipality in Kaynaşlı District:
 Kaynaşlı

There are 20 villages in Kaynaşlı District:

 Altunköy
 Bıçkıyanı
 Çakırsayvan
 Çamlıca
 Çamoluk
 Çatalçam
 Darıyeri Bakacak
 Darıyeri Hasanbey
 Darıyeri Mengencik
 Darıyeri Yörükler
 Dipsizgöl
 Fındıklı
 Hacıazizler
 Muratbey
 Sarıçökek
 Sazköy
 Tavak
 Üçköprü
 Yeniyurt
 Yeşiltepe

References

Districts of Düzce Province